Robert Irving Soare is an American mathematician. He is the Paul Snowden Russell Distinguished Service Professor of Mathematics and Computer Science at the University of Chicago, where he has been on the faculty since 1967. He proved, together with Carl Jockusch, the low basis theorem, and has done other work in mathematical logic, primarily in the area of computability theory.

In 2012 he became a fellow of the American Mathematical Society.

Selected publications 

C. G. Jockusch Jr. and R. I. Soare, "Π(0, 1) Classes and Degrees of Theories" in Transactions of the American Mathematical Society (1972).

See also
Jockusch–Soare forcing

References

External links 
 Professional homepage
 

Living people
Year of birth missing (living people)
University of Chicago faculty
20th-century American mathematicians
21st-century American mathematicians
Fellows of the American Mathematical Society